The 37th Junior World Luge Championships took place under the auspices of the International Luge Federation in Winterberg, Germany from 28 to 29 January 2022.

Schedule
Five events were held.

All times are local (UTC+1).

Medalists

Medal table

References

Junior World Luge Championships
Junior World Luge Championships
Junior World Luge Championships
Luge
Sports competitions in North Rhine-Westphalia
International luge competitions hosted by Germany
Junior World Luge Championships